George Pawlaczyk (born 1945) is an investigative journalist for the Belleville News-Democrat in Belleville, IL.

In 1968, he served in the United States Army as a reporter and photographer for the 1st Infantry Division newspaper in Vietnam. See coverage about him in reference in Time magazine in this entry.

Awards
 2007 co-winner of Robert F. Kennedy Award
 2009 co-winner George Polk Award
 2010 co-winner John Jay Excellence in Criminal Justice Reporting Awards 
2012 co-winner IRE Award for Investigative Reporting

Book
Murder on a Lonely Road, with Beth Hundsdorfer, Berkeley (2012)

References

External links
Belleville News-Democrat: Archive of George Pawlaczyk's stories
"Anatomy of a Rumor", NPR: Talk of the Nation, December 7, 2005

1946 births
Living people
American investigative journalists
United States Army personnel of the Vietnam War
George Polk Award recipients
United States Army soldiers
American war correspondents